Liyan Khan (born 18 November 1991) is an Indian cricketer. He made his first-class debut for Karnataka in the 2018–19 Ranji Trophy on 30 December 2018. He made his Twenty20 debut on 4 November 2021, for Sikkim in the 2021–22 Syed Mushtaq Ali Trophy. He made his List A debut on 8 December 2021, for Sikkim in the 2021–22 Vijay Hazare Trophy.

References

External links
 

1991 births
Living people
Indian cricketers
Karnataka cricketers
Sikkim cricketers
Place of birth missing (living people)